Pir Badam (also Romanized as Pīr Bādām) is a village in Mehraban-e Sofla Rural District, Gol Tappeh District, Kabudarahang County, Hamadan Province, Iran. At the 2006 census, its population was 467, in 107 families.

References 

Populated places in Kabudarahang County